Mary Rose O'Reilley is an American poet, novelist and writer of non-fiction.

Life
O'Reilley was born in Pampa, Texas, and educated in Roseville and Saint Paul, Minnesota. She was raised a Catholic, is now a member of the Religious Society of Friends (Quakers). She has spent time in Buddhist practice, in particular under Thich Nhat Hanh.  She graduated from the College of St. Catherine and completed the Ph.D. at the University of Wisconsin–Milwaukee.

From 1978 to 2006, she taught English and environmental studies at the college/University of St. Thomas.

O'Reilley lives on an island in Puget Sound.

Awards
 2005 Walt Whitman Award
 Contemplative Studies Grant from the American Council of Learned Societies
 Bush Artist Grant
 McKnight Award of Distinction
2018 Brighthorse Prize for the novel (Bright Morning Stars)

Works

Fiction

Poetry

Non-fiction
 
The Garden at Night.  Heinemann
Radical Presence. Heinemann

Ploughshares

References

Year of birth missing (living people)
Living people
People from Pampa, Texas
Writers from Saint Paul, Minnesota
St. Catherine University alumni
University of Wisconsin–Milwaukee alumni
University of St. Thomas (Minnesota) faculty
People from Roseville, Minnesota
American women poets
Poets from Minnesota
Poets from Texas
American women academics